Sir Walter Wyndham Burrell, 5th Baronet JP (26 October 1814 – 24 January 1886) was a British barrister, Conservative politician and Freemason.

Background
He was the third son of Sir Charles Burrell, 3rd Baronet and his wife Frances Wyndham, a daughter of George Wyndham, 3rd Earl of Egremont. Burrell was called to the bar at Lincoln's Inn in 1840.  He served in the British Army and was an officer in the 2nd Sussex Rifle Volunteers. From 1877, Burrell was Grand Master of the Provincial Grand Lodge of Sussex.

Career

In 1865, Burrell contested East Sussex unsuccessfully.  He succeeded his older brother Percy as baronet in 1876 and entered the British House of Commons in the same year, sitting for New Shoreham, the constituency his father and brother had also represented before, until its abolishment in 1885. Burrell was High Sheriff of Sussex in 1871.

Family
On 10 June 1847, he married Dorothea Jones, youngest daughter of Reverend John Applethwaite Jones, at St James's Church, Piccadilly. They had four daughters and two sons. Burrell died aged 71, at West Grinstead Park and was buried at Shipley, Sussex. He was succeeded in the baronetcy by his oldest son Charles.

References

External links

1814 births
1886 deaths
Baronets in the Baronetage of Great Britain
Walter
High Sheriffs of Sussex
Members of Lincoln's Inn
Conservative Party (UK) MPs for English constituencies
UK MPs 1874–1880
UK MPs 1880–1885